Lytle Creek  is a census-designated place in the San Gabriel Mountains, within San Bernardino County.

This small remote community is located in a large southeast-trending canyon on the eastern portion of the San Gabriel
Mountains completely within the boundaries of the San Bernardino National Forest. The population was 701 at the 2010 census.

The ZIP Code for Lytle Creek is 92358 and the community is inside area code 909.

Geography
According to the United States Census Bureau, the CDP covers an area of 6.0 square miles (15.6 km), all of it land.

Climate
According to the Köppen Climate Classification system, Lytle Creek has a warm-summer Mediterranean climate, abbreviated "Csa" on climate maps.

History
A group of Mormons arrived in the valley in 1851, making camp at the mouth of a canyon with a creek, which flowed
briskly southeast through the canyon to the valley and the Santa Ana River. Overjoyed with the abundance of
water, the dense growth of willows, cottonwoods and sycamores and the mustard and wild oats that grew on
the hillsides, the settlers of San Bernardino named the stream "Lytle Creek" after their leader, Captain Andrew Lytle. Lytle
Creek Canyon has been a site for gold mining, farming and recreation activities such as fishing, camping,
picnicking, and hiking. It has been considered a recreational area since the early 1870s.

Public schools
All middle school and high school students in Lytle Creek travel down to Rialto to attend schools in
Rialto Unified School District

Elementary students attend Kordyak Elementary school in Rialto.

Local Newspaper
Lytle Creek has its own newspaper "The Canyon" published by the Lytle Creek Community Center since 1948.  All work is done by volunteers
Under the Community Center Board of Trustees (a nonprofit organization), Ciji Mobley runs the Youth Group, Anna Sorum distributes commodities to about 100 individuals and runs a local branch of the San Bernardino County Library, Ken Philips delivers meals to the homebound, and Mary Stinson manages the local Red Cross emergency shelter program. Sally Boyd directs an active branch of CERT (Community Emergency Response Team) also operates with county OES.

Safety
Lytle Creek is patrolled by the San Bernardino County Fontana Sheriff Station (which also serves unincorporated Fontana and Bloomington).

Fire protection services are mainly provided by The San Bernardino County Fire Department (SBCoFD) Service Area 38 which
provides administration and support for County Service Area 38 fire
district and other services such as hazardous materials regulation, dispatch communication and
disaster preparedness. In Lytle Creek, the San Bernardino County Fire Department (SBCoFD)
provides services through the Valley Division of their department.
Other agencies providing fire protection services and or fire related information for the Lytle Creek
community include the California Department of Forestry and Fire Protection (CAL FIRE) and the
Mountain Area Safety Taskforce (MAST). In addition, the US Forest Service has a station located in the Lytle Creek area.

Demographics
The 2010 United States Census reported that Lytle Creek had a population of 701. The racial makeup of Lytle Creek was 606 (86%) White (79% Non-Hispanic White), 6 (1%) African American, 7 (1%) Native American, 23 (3%) Asian, 0 (0%) Pacific Islander, 25 (4%) from other races, and 34 (5%) from two or more races. Hispanic or Latino of any race were 98 persons (14%).

The Census reported that 701 people (100% of the population) lived in households, 0 (0%) lived in non-institutionalized group quarters, and 0 (0%) were institutionalized.

There were 336 households, out of which 64 (19%) had children under the age of 18 living in them, 158 (47%) were opposite-sex married couples living together, 25 (7%) had a female householder with no husband present, 11 (3%) had a male householder with no wife present.  There were 20 (6%) unmarried opposite-sex partnerships, and 4 (1%) same-sex married couples or partnerships. 120 households (36%) were made up of individuals, and 46 (14%) had someone living alone who was 65 years of age or older. The average household size was 2.09.  There were 194 families (58% of all households); the average family size was 2.69.

The population was spread out, with 102 people (15%) under the age of 18, 31 people (4%) aged 18 to 24, 114 people (16%) aged 25 to 44, 315 people (45%) aged 45 to 64, and 139 people (20%) who were 65 years of age or older.  The median age was 52.0 years. For every 100 females, there were 106.2 males.  For every 100 females age 18 and over, there were 101.7 males.

The homeowner vacancy rate was 3%; the rental vacancy rate was 15%.  512 people (73% of the population) lived in owner-occupied housing units and 189 people (27%) lived in rental housing units.

According to the 2010 United States Census, Lytle Creek had a median household income of $77,568, with 2. of the population living below the federal poverty line.

Government

References

External links
 |86000US92358&_street=&_county=&_cityTown=&_state=&_zip=92358&_lang=en&_sse=on&ActiveGeoDiv=&_useEV=&pctxt=fph&pgsl=860&_submenuId=factsheet_1&ds_name=null&_ci_nbr=null&qr_name=null&reg=null%3Anull&_keyword=&_industry=&show_2003_tab=&redirect=Y Demographic information on Lytle Creek

Census-designated places in San Bernardino County, California
San Gabriel Mountains
Populated places established in 1851
1851 establishments in California
Census-designated places in California